Sacha Guimond (born March 28, 1991) is a Canadian professional ice hockey defenceman. Having already played in Canada, the United States, Slovenia, Slovakia and Austria, he now plays for the Dragons de Rouen in France.

Playing career
Guimond played major junior hockey in both the Ontario Hockey League and the Quebec Major Junior Hockey League.

His professional career started in 2012 when he first played with the San Francisco Bulls and then with the Gwinnett Gladiators, both of the ECHL. He also played six games in the American Hockey League during his first season. Guimond was rewarded for his outstanding play when the ECHL named him the 2012–13 defenceman of the year and selected him to both the All-Rookie and All-ECHL teams

On July 12, 2013, Guimond signed a one-year contract with the Utica Comets of the American Hockey League, an affiliate of the Vancouver Canucks.

After a second stint with the Kalamazoo Wings, Guimond left to resume his European career, agreeing to a one-year deal with Slovenian club, HDD Olimpija Ljubljana, competing in the Austrian EBEL, on July 6, 2016.
Following further stints in Austria and Slovakia, he left the Slovak Bratislava Capitals to join Rouen in France.

Career statistics

Regular season and playoffs

Awards and honours

References

External links

1991 births
Living people
Canadian people of French descent
Baie-Comeau Drakkar players
HC '05 Banská Bystrica players
Canadian ice hockey defencemen
Canadian expatriate ice hockey players in Slovakia
Gwinnett Gladiators players
HC TWK Innsbruck players
HDD Olimpija Ljubljana players
Kalamazoo Wings (ECHL) players
London Knights players
Norfolk Admirals players
Ontario Reign (ECHL) players
Ice hockey people from Quebec
San Francisco Bulls players
Utica Comets players
Worcester Sharks players
Bratislava Capitals players
Canadian expatriate ice hockey players in Slovenia
Canadian expatriate ice hockey players in the United States
Canadian expatriate ice hockey players in Austria
Canadian expatriate ice hockey players in France